Harry Plummer (born 19 June 1998 in New Zealand) is a New Zealand rugby union player who plays for the  in Super Rugby. His playing position is fly-half though he is often played at centre. He has signed for the Blues squad in 2019.

Reference list

External links
itsrugby.co.uk profile

1998 births
New Zealand rugby union players
Living people
Rugby union fly-halves
Rugby union players from Auckland
People educated at St Peter's College, Auckland
Auckland rugby union players
Blues (Super Rugby) players
Rugby union centres